Al(l)ison Taylor may refer to:

Alison Elizabeth Taylor (born 1972), American artist
Alison Taylor, screenwriter on Married... with Children
Alison Taylor (bishop), assistant bishop in the Anglican Diocese of Brisbane
Alison Taylor (curler) (born 1987), Canadian curler
Alison Taylor, editor of The Archaeologist
Allison Taylor, 24 character
Allison Taylor (Simpsons character)